3LW (initialism of "3 Lil Women") was an American girl group formed in 1999 by Adrienne Bailon, Kiely Williams, and Naturi Naughton. Jessica Benson later replaced Naughton after she left the group in 2002. 3LW was signed to the label Epic Records, and later moved to So So Def. They are best known for their singles "No More (Baby I'ma Do Right)", "Playas Gon' Play" and "I Do (Wanna Get Close to You)".

History

1999–2001: 3LW
In 1999, the group 3LW was formed by sisters Michelle & Tse Williams. Michelle's daughter & Tse's younger sister/niece Kiely Williams was the first member into the lineup and the group would soon be rounded out by Adrienne Bailon & Naturi Naughton, with both Michelle and Tse as head of the group's management. Their debut single, "No More (Baby I'ma Do Right)", was released in the fall of 2000. "No More (Baby I'ma Do Right)" was a chart success, and was followed by "Playas Gon' Play" in early 2001. The group's self-titled debut album, 3LW was released on December 5, 2000. The album went on to be certified platinum by the RIAA, selling 1.3 million copies in the US. In the summer of 2001, the group embarked on the MTV Total Request Live Tour along with Destiny's Child, Dream, Nelly, Eve, and Jessica Simpson. 

In 2001, 3LW recorded "What More Can I Give" as part of a supergroup of various artists including Michael Jackson, Reba McEntire, Usher, Beyoncé, Luther Vandross, Céline Dion, and Mariah Carey in response to the September 11 attacks. In late 2001 they collaborated with Lil' Romeo and Nick Cannon for a cover of "Parents Just Don't Understand" on the Jimmy Neutron: Boy Genius soundtrack.

3LW spent the first half of 2002 in the studio, recording an album tentatively titled Same Game, Different Rules. The album and its intended lead single "Uh Oh" were presented to the label, who felt it did not have enough urban radio appeal. The tracks from Same Game, Different Rules were leaked to the Internet in MP3 format, and Epic considered dropping the girls. A fan support campaign for 3LW named 'Never Let Go Of 3LW' (after their song "Never Let Go") gained traction, and the act was retained.

2002–2003: A Girl Can Mack and Naughton's departure
Recording a new set of tracks, the group returned in the summer of 2002 with the P. Diddy-produced single "I Do (Wanna Get Close To You)", featuring Loon. That same summer, the group performed a concert special on Nickelodeon titled Live on Sunset. By August, the group was set to release its newest LP, A Girl Can Mack, when member Naughton left the group. In an interview on Wendy Williams' radio show, Naughton alleged that she had a number of conflicts with Bailon, Williams, and their management, which led to an August 2002 altercation involving a plate of food from KFC. Naughton later claimed that she was forced out of the group.

Williams and Bailon continued as a duo while using the "3LW" name, causing the press to jokingly refer to them as "2LW".  The departure of Naughton greatly affected the group's popularity and album sales. According to a cover story for the October 2002 issue of Sister 2 Sister magazine, Williams and Bailon said they received death threats. A Girl Can Mack'''s release date was pushed back a month and debuted at No. 15 on the Billboard 200 with 53,000 copies sold in the first week. After the second single released from the album, "Neva Get Enuf", underperformed, the group released a Christmas-themed LP Naughty or Nice, which failed to appear on any major Billboard charts. After nationwide auditions for a new third member, fifteen year old Jessica 'J' Benson was selected as the third member and made her first appearance with the group in March 2003.

2003–2007: Canceled third album and breakup
In the midst of 3LW's public drama, Bailon and Williams signed on to star in the Disney Channel original movie The Cheetah Girls in 2003, alongside Raven-Symoné and Sabrina Bryan. Due to the success of the film, Disney decided to turn the project into a real girl band. As the Cheetah Girls project grew, with albums released and world tours, 3LW was on 3 years of hiatus. The progress on 3LW's third studio album, titled Point of No Return,   became a background for Bailon and Williams and was delayed several times. Only on August 15, 2006, after four years, the group released their new single, "Feelin' You". Despite this, Point of No Return was shelved and Bailon and Williams continued working on The Cheetah Girls. On January 7, 2008, Bailon confirmed in an interview with BlogTalkRadio that 3LW officially disbanded in 2007, after the release of "Feelin' You".

In 2022, three previously unreleased songs recorded in 2003-2005 – Trouble", "After This" and "How U Gonna Act" – were released on iTunes. As of January 2023, these tracks have since been removed from iTunes.

In popular culture
 3LW are featured as bonus characters in the 2001 video game NBA Street.
 In January 2001, 3LW appeared in an episode of the Nickelodeon series Taina as a fictional girl group (along with the same name of this episode) called Blue Mascara where the main character (Christina Vidal) is overjoyed to become a member of the popular all-female singing group at school until they tell her that she must get rid of Renee (Khaliah Adams).
 In October 2001, 3LW appeared on the Disney Channel series The Jersey in the episode "Speaking of Coleman" where after freaking out at a debate competition, Coleman Galloway (Jermaine Williams) gets a lesson in handling stage fright by jumping into the body of one of the three members of the group which in general was Kiely Williams.
 In November 2002, 3LW appeared in an episode of the Nickelodeon sketch comedy series All That.

 Past members 
 Adrienne Bailon (1999–2007)
 Naturi Naughton (1999–2002)
 Kiely Williams (1999–2007)
 Jessica Benson (2002–2007)

Discography

Studio albums
 3LW (2000)
 A Girl Can Mack (2002)
 Naughty or Nice (2002)
 Point of No Return'' (shelved)

Awards and nominations

References

External links
 3LW on MySpace

Musical groups established in 2000
Musical groups disestablished in 2006
So So Def Recordings artists
Epic Records artists
American contemporary R&B musical groups
American pop girl groups
American girl groups
Teen pop groups
1999 establishments in New Jersey